is a Japanese actress. She is best known for playing Lije in Bakuryū Sentai Abaranger, Naomi in Drama 8 Geinōsha, Akemi Nagase in Kaidan Shin Mimibukuro: Yūrei Mansion, Yuri Nakanishi in Threads of Destiny, and Yurine in Karas.

Filmography

Theatre

Television

Films

OVA

References

1990 births
21st-century Japanese actresses
Living people